There are a number of reports about the involvement of Chinese detachments in the Russian Revolution and Russian Civil War.  Chinese served as bodyguards of Bolshevik functionaries, served in the Cheka,<ref name=Rayfield>Donald Rayfield, Stalin and His Hangmen: The Tyrant and Those Who Killed for Him, Viking Press 2004:  (hardcover)
"In 1919, 75 percent of the Cheka's central management was Latvian. When Russian soldiers refused to carry out executions, Latvian (and Chinese force of some 500 men) were brought in.</ref> and even formed complete regiments of the Red Army. It has been estimated that there were tens of thousands of Chinese troops in the Red Army, and they were among the few groups of foreigners fighting for the Red Army.

Other notable examples of foreigners serving in the Red Army include Koreans in the Russian Far East,German Kim (1999) "The History of Korean Immigration", Book 1, Second half of 19th Century – 1945", Almaty, Dayk-Press Czech and Slovak nationals, Hungarian Jewish Bolsheviks under Béla Kun, Red Latvian Riflemen as well as a number of other national detachments. By the summer of 1919, the Red Army comprised over a million men.  By November 1920, it comprised over 1.8 million men. Foreign soldiers did not make up a significant bulk of the Red Army, and the majority of the soldiers of the Red Army fighting in the Russian Revolution and Russian Civil War were Russians.

Background: Chinese speakers in Russia
Large numbers of Chinese lived and worked in Siberia in the late Russian Empire. Many of these migrant workers were transferred to the European part of Russia and to the Ural during World War I because of the acute shortage of workers there. For example, by 1916 there were about 5,000 Chinese workers in Novgorod Governorate. In 1916-1917 about 2,000 Chinese workers were employed in the construction of Russian fortifications around the Gulf of Finland. A significant number of them were convicted robbers (honghuzi, "Red Beards", transliterated into Russian as "khunkhuzy", хунхузы) transferred from katorga labor camps in Harbin and other locations in the Far Eastern regions of the Russian Empire. After the Russian Revolution, some of them stayed in Finland and took part as volunteers in the Finnish Civil War on the allied communist side. After 1917 many of these Chinese workers joined the Red Army. The vast majority of these Chinese were apolitical and become soldiers solely in order to gain rights as workers in a foreign country.

Dungans in the 1916 Revolt
Dungans fought alongside Kyrgyz rebels in attacking Przheval'sk during the 1916 Basmachi revolt.

A Dungan Muslim and communist Commander Magaza Masanchi of the Dungan Cavalry Regiment fought for the Soviet Union against the Basmachis. He also took part in other actions in central Asia.

 Chinese detachments in service of Soviet state 

Chinese in the Red Army

The Chinese with the Red Army were recruited from factory workers who had been attracted into Russia before the war and sided with the urban proletariat with whom they worked.  Separate Chinese units fought for the Bolsheviks in the Ukraine, Transcaucasia and Siberia.

One estimate suggests that there were hundreds of thousands of Chinese troops in the Red Army. Nonetheless, Brian Murphy asserts that "the number of Chinese troops did not constitute a significant fraction of the Red Army." By summer of 1919, the Red Army comprised over a million men.  By November 1920, it comprised over 1.8 million men.

Chinese units were involved in virtually every front of the Russian Civil War.  Some sincerely sympathized with the Bolsheviks who treated them as "proletarian brothers".  Others simply joined the Red Army in order to survive and others wanted to fight their way home to China.

The Chinese were one of several foreign contingents dubbed in Soviet historiography as "internationalist detachments" ("отряды интернационалистов"). Chinese internationalist troops wore the same uniform as the rest of the Red Army.

The Bolsheviks found special value in the use of Chinese troops who were considered to be industrious and efficient.  In addition, they were seldom able to understand Russian, which kept them insulated from outside influences.

The use of Chinese troops by the Bolsheviks was commented on by both White Russian and non-Russian observers.

In fact, the Bolsheviks were often derided for their reliance on Chinese and Lettish volunteers.
Anti-Bolshevik propaganda suggested that the Bolsheviks did not have the support of the Russian people and thus had to resort to foreign mercenaries who ran roughshod over the Russian populace.

In 1918, Dmitri Gavronsky, a member of the Russian Constituent Assembly, asserted that the Bolsheviks based their power chiefly on foreign support.  He asserted that, "in Moscow, they have at their disposal 16,000 well-armed Lettish soldiers, some detachments of Finnish Red Guards and a large battalion of Chinese troops."  Gavronsky added that "The latter are always used for executions."
 
In his book Between Red and White, Leon Trotsky makes sarcastic reference to the charge that the Soviets held Petrograd and Moscow "by the aid of 'Lettish, Chinese, German and Bashkir regiments'".

The Red Army commander Iona Yakir headed a Chinese detachment guarding Lenin and Trotsky. Later he headed a regiment made up of volunteer Chinese workers, which achieved distinction in battle when the Red Army heavily defeated (temporarily) Romanian troops in February 1918 during the Romanian occupation of Bessarabia.

There was also a Chinese detachment in the "Konarmiya" 1st Cavalry Army of Semyon Budyonny.

Chinese in the Cheka and military guard units

Some Chinese volunteers, who had fanatical devotion to the revolution, were allowed to join the Cheka and various military guard detachments. In 1919, there were some 700 Chinese troops in the Cheka. The Cheka utilized them for the arrest and execution of anti-Soviet soldiers.

Chinese participation in the Allied intervention
The Beiyang government in north China joined the Allied intervention in the Russian Civil War. They sent forces numbering 2,300 in Siberia and North Russia beginning in 1918, after the Chinese community in the area requested aid. Many of these soldiers later defected to the Red Army.

 1930s 
Despite many Chinese serving in the Red Army, the Soviet Chinese were repressed and arrested starting in 1928. By 1938, few Chinese remained in European Russia or the Russian Far East.

Notable persons
Ren Fuchen (任辅臣) (1884–1918) from Tieling was the first Bolshevik in North Liaoning and a commander of the Chinese regiment of the Soviet Red Army. He is commemorated as a revolutionary hero in the People's Republic of China.History 

In literature

There is a 1923 short story, Chinese Story by Mikhail Bulgakov, about a Chinese mercenary in the Red Army.

The 1929 comic book by Hergé "Tintin au pays des soviets" includes a scene where Tintin is put in a cell to be tortured by Chinese Cheka/NKVD professionals.

The 1936 historical novel Names in Marble'' by the Estonian author Albert Kivikas describes the fate of some captured Chinese soldiers whose units were part of the invading Russian army, in the hands of the Estonian patriots during the Estonian War of Independence.

See also
International Brigades - detachments of foreigners who fought for the Republicans during Spanish Civil War
Chinese-Lenin School of Vladivostok (1924-1938)

References

Russian Civil War
Allied intervention in the Russian Civil War
China–Soviet Union relations
Expatriate military units and formations